Sharad Thakre (7 September 1968 – 20 November 2014) was an Indian cricketer. He played two first-class matches for Vidarbha in 1993/94.

References

External links
 

1968 births
2014 deaths
Indian cricketers
Vidarbha cricketers
Cricketers from Nagpur